Changjin or Chang Jin or variant, may refer to:

Places
Changjin County (장진군, 長津郡), a county in South Hamgyong province, North Korea.
 Lake Changjin (장진호, 長津湖), also known as the Chosin Reservoir, site of the Korean War battle
 Changjin Line, an electrified rail line running alongside the lake
 Changjin Air Force Base, in the eponymous county
 Changjin River (장진강; 長津江), a tributary of the Yalu River in North Korea

People

Given name "Chang-jin"
 Jang Geum (Chinese: Chang-jin, 長今; Chángjīn), female physician of the Joseon Dynasty
 Moon Chang-jin (문창진; born 1993), South Korea soccer player
 Chang-Jin Lee, Korean-American artist

Given name "Jin" surnamed "Chang"
 Jang Jin (장진, 張鎭; born 1971; aka Chang Jin), a South Korean film director
 Chang Jin (Chinese: 常进; born 1966). Chinese astronomer

Other uses
 Battle of Chosin Reservoir (aka Battle of Changjin), a 1950 battle during the Korean War

See also

 Da Chang Jin (Great Chang Jin; 대장금; 大長今), a South Korean TV historical drama about the historical female physician Chang Jin
 
 
 Jinchang (disambiguation)
 Chang (disambiguation)
 Jin (disambiguation)